Belfort Chaux Airport is a small aerodrome in Chaux, a commune in the Territoire de Belfort department in Franche-Comté in north eastern France. There is an aeroclub based here.

The airport is served by only one regular bus link, provided by Optymo. This is bus line number 37, which runs from Belfort town centre every hour. A restaurant with excellent views across the airfield is open all year. Parking is available on site. This is the only airport in Belfort, after the closure of Belfort's other airport in the 1970s.

Facilities

There are no visual aids to aircraft on the airfield. There are also hangars used to store light aircraft, mainly for the aeroclub. The airport has also been used for music festivals and special events including air shows, usually in summer.

The airport has some physical challenges. It is situated next to mountain ranges, which causes strong and sometimes severe northeast winds. During winter, the airport is usually closed if the runways are covered in snow.

References

External links
 

Airports in Bourgogne-Franche-Comté
Territoire de Belfort
Airports established in 1917